The Son of the Red Corsair (Italian: Il figlio del corsaro rosso) is a 1959 Italian historical adventure film written and directed by Primo Zeglio and starring Lex Barker, Sylvia Lopez and Vira Silenti. It is based on the novel with the same name by Emilio Salgari. The story had previously been made into a 1943 film The Son of the Red Corsair.

The film's sets were designed by the art directors Mario Chiari and Alfredo Montori.

Cast 
 
 Lex Barker as  Enrico di Ventimiglia 
 Sylvia Lopez as  Carmen di Montélimar 
 Vira Silenti as  Neala di Ventimiglia 
 Luciano Marin as  Miguel di Montélimar 
 Antonio Crast as  Don Juan de Sasebo 
 Fanfulla as Marquese di Montélimar 
 Vicky Lagos as  Paquita 
 Roberto Paoletti as  Barrejo 
 Nietta Zocchi as  Isabella 
 Saro Urzì as  Mendoza 
 Elio Pandolfi as  Sergeant  
 Livio Lorenzon as  José 
 Franco Fantasia as  Dorado
 Giorgio Costantini as Van Hais

References

Bibliography 
 Goble, Alan. The Complete Index to Literary Sources in Film. Walter de Gruyter, 1999.

External links

1959 films
Italian historical adventure films
1950s historical adventure films
Films directed by Primo Zeglio
Films based on The Corsairs of the Antilles
Films set in the 17th century
1950s Italian films